Dennis Victor Hillman (27 November 1918 – 22 December 1994) was an English footballer who played in the Football League as an outside right for Colchester United and Gillingham.

Career

Born in Southend-on-Sea, Hillman began his career with Brighton & Hove Albion, although he failed to break into the first-team with the club, opting to return to Essex with Colchester United shortly after World War II in 1946. He would go on to make 107 Southern League appearances for the club and appeared on four occasions in the Football League after Colchester's election in 1950.

Hillman made his Southern League debut on 28 September 1946 in a 3–2 home victory against Worcester City and scored his first goal for the club in a 3–3 draw at Bath City on 2 November of the same year. He would go on to score 18 times in the Southern League, scoring his final goal in the second leg of the Southern League Cup final against Bath, resulting in a 3–4 defeat as Colchester won 6–4 on aggregate on 3 May 1950. He played his last game for the U's on 24 March 1951, a Third Division South 3–0 defeat by rivals Ipswich Town.

Gillingham signed Hillman in August 1951 from Colchester, making 21 appearances for the club, eventually losing his place to Bill Burtenshaw. He would later play for Hastings United and Ramsgate Athletic.

Dennis Hillman died aged 76 on 22 December 1994 in a road accident.

References

1918 births
1994 deaths
Sportspeople from Southend-on-Sea
English footballers
Association football wingers
Brighton & Hove Albion F.C. players
Colchester United F.C. players
Gillingham F.C. players
Hastings United F.C. (1948) players
Ramsgate F.C. players
English Football League players
Road incident deaths in England
Brentford F.C. wartime guest players